This is an incomplete list of ghost towns in Connecticut.

 Bara-Hack
 Dudleytown
 Gay City
 Johnsonville Village
 Pleasure Beach

Notes and references

 
Connecticut
Ghost towns